Mount Poster is a mountain lying west of the Latady Mountains and 9 nautical miles (17 km) northwest of Mount Tenney, in Palmer Land. Mapped by United States Geological Survey (USGS) from surveys and U.S. Navy air photos, 1961–67. Named by Advisory Committee on Antarctic Names (US-ACAN) for Carl K. Poster, geophysicist with the United States Antarctic Research Program (USARP) South Pole—Queen Maud Land Traverse III, summer 1967–68.

Mountains of Palmer Land